Gundi is a small village of the Bhojpur district of Bihar state, India. It is the birthplace of Awdhoot Bhagwan Ram.

References

Villages in Bhojpur district, India